Playmation  is a system of toys, wearables, and companion apps from Disney and Hasbro. The system is designed to keep kids active, replacing screens with pretend play. Players can receive missions through a companion app, and track scores and accomplishments.

The toy system launched in October 2015 with the Marvel Avengers collection. Star Wars and Frozen were planned for 2016 and 2017.

It is reported that much of the development team has been laid-off and that while the existing Avengers product line would continue to be sold through Christmas 2016 any further development is on hold.

See also
Toys-to-life

References

External links

2015 video games
Smart devices
Electronic toys
IOS games
Android (operating system) games
Toys-to-life games
Video games developed in the United States